Joshua Speight (8 February 1881 – 18 October 1952) was a British gymnast. He competed in the men's team all-around event at the 1908 Summer Olympics.

References

External links
 

1881 births
1952 deaths
British male artistic gymnasts
Olympic gymnasts of Great Britain
Gymnasts at the 1908 Summer Olympics